Joske Van Santberghe (born 8 August 1949) is a Belgian middle- and long-distance runner.

She competed mainly in cross country running and was bronze medallist at the 1973 IAAF World Cross Country Championships, held on home turf in Waregem. Van Santberghe represented Belgium for five straight years across the International Cross Country Championships and the IAAF World Cross Country Championships, from 1970 to 1974.

During her career she was a member of Daring Club Leuven athletics club and claimed five national titles, four in cross country and one in the 1500 metres.

In 1972 she married fellow Belgian world cross country medallist Eric De Beck.

International competitions

National titles
Belgian Athletics Championships
1500 metres: 1971
Belgian Cross Country Championships
Long course: 1971, 1972, 1973, 1974

References

External links



Living people
1949 births
Belgian female middle-distance runners
Belgian female long-distance runners